The Journal of Tissue Engineering is a peer-reviewed open-access medical journal that covers research on tissue engineering. Its editors-in-chief are Hae-Won Kim (Dankook University) and Jonathan Knowles (UCL Eastman Dental Institute). It was established in 2010 and is published by SAGE Publications.

Abstracting and indexing 
The Journal of Tissue Engineering is abstracted and indexed in:
 Academic Complete
 Biological Abstracts
 CSA Illumina
 EBSCO Discovery Service
 PubMed Central

External links 
 

SAGE Publishing academic journals
English-language journals
Regenerative medicine journals
Open access journals
Publications established in 2010